Imke Susann Onnen (born 17 August 1994) is a German athlete specialising in the high jump. She won a bronze medal at the 2019 Summer Universiade.

Her personal bests in the event are 1.94 metres outdoors (Göttingen 2019) and 1.96 metres indoors (Leipzig 2019).

She comes from a sporting family, her brother Eike also being a high jumper while mother Astrid Fredebold-Onnen a former heptathlete (as well as Imke's coach).

International competitions

References

External links
Official site

1994 births
Living people
German female high jumpers
People from Hanover Region
Universiade bronze medalists for Germany
Universiade medalists in athletics (track and field)
Medalists at the 2019 Summer Universiade
Athletes (track and field) at the 2020 Summer Olympics
Olympic athletes of Germany
Sportspeople from Lower Saxony